The 1931 Delaware Fightin' Blue Hens football team was an American football team that represented the University of Delaware in the 1931 college football season. In their first season under head coach Charles Rogers, the Blue Hens compiled a 5–1–2 record and outscored opponents by a total of 118 to 25. The team played its home games at Frazer Field in Newark, Delaware.

Schedule

References

Delaware
Delaware Fightin' Blue Hens football seasons
Delaware Fightin' Blue Hens football